Francisco Camps de la Carrera y Molés (1603–1656) was a Roman Catholic prelate who served as Bishop of Bosa (1654–1656).

Biography
Francisco Camps de la Carrera y Molés was born in Solsona, Lleida, Spain in 1603.
On 12 January 1654, he was appointed during the papacy of Pope Innocent X as Bishop of Bosa.
On 11 July 1655, he was consecrated bishop by Francesco Maria Brancaccio, Bishop of Viterbo e Tuscania. 
He served as Bishop of Bosa until his death on 10 January 1656.

References 

17th-century Roman Catholic bishops in Spain
Bishops appointed by Pope Innocent X
1603 births
1656 deaths